This is the first edition of the tournament.

Seeds

Draw

References
 Main Draw

Wroclaw Open - Doubles